Kayla Day was the defending champion, but lost in the semifinal to Victoria Duval.

Anna Karolína Schmiedlová won the title after defeating Duval 6–4, 6–1 in the final.

Seeds

Draw

Finals

Top half

Bottom half

References
Main Draw

Tennis Classic of Macon - Singles